The Daïat Labguer (M'sila) massacre took place on June 16, 1997, less than two weeks after parliamentary elections, in the hamlet of Daïat Labguer (M'sila) (also spelled Dairat Labguar, Dairat Lebguar, Daïat Labguer, Daïret Lebguer, Dairet Lebguer) near M'sila, 300 km southeast of Algiers.  About 50 people were killed by some 30 guerrillas, who also kidnapped women, killed the livestock, and stole riches.  Five days earlier, another 17 had been killed at a village some 5 km away.  The massacre was attributed to Islamist groups such as the Armed Islamic Group.

See also
 List of massacres in Algeria
 List of Algerian massacres of the 1990s

References
Business Recorder 
Humanite

Algerian massacres of the 1990s
Massacres in 1997
1997 in Algeria
Conflicts in 1997
June 1997 events in Africa